Miss World 1973, the 23rd edition of the Miss World pageant, was held on 23 November 1973 at the Royal Albert Hall in London, United Kingdom. 54 delegates vied for the crown won by Marjorie Wallace of United States. She was crowned by Belinda Green of Australia. Wallace won $7,200 in prize money for the first-place result.

104 days after her reign, Marjorie Wallace was dethroned from her title. The Miss World 1973 title and duties was not offered to any of the other participants. 1st Runner-Up Evangeline Pascual of the Philippines pre-empted this decision by declaring she did not want the 'second hand crown'. Patsy Yuen of Jamaica who placed 2nd Runner-Up performed some of the duties and responsibilities of Miss World that had already been scheduled, without holding the title.

Results

Placements

Contestants

  – Ellen Peters
  – Beatriz Callejón †
  – Edwina Diaz
  – Virginia Radinas
  – Roswitha Kobald
  – Deborah Louise Isaacs
  – Christine Devisch
  – Judy Joy Richards
  – Priscilla Molefe
  – Florence Gambogi Alvarenga
  – Deborah Anne Ducharme
  – Elsa María Springstube Ramírez
  – Demetra Heraklidou
  – Clariza Duarte Garrido
  – Seija Mäkinen
  – Isabelle Nadia Krumacker
  – Josephine Rodríguez
  – Katerina Papadimitriou
  – Shirley Ann Brennan
  – Anna Maria Groot
  – Belinda Handal
  – Judy Yung Chu-Dic
  – Nína Breiðfjörd
  – Yvonne Costelloe
  – Chaja Katzir
  – Marva Bartolucci
  – Patsy Yuen
  – Keiko Matsunaga
  – An Soon-young
  – Sylva Ohannessian
  – Giselle Anita Nicole Azzeri
  – Narimah Mohd Yusoff
  – Carmen Farrugia
  – Daisy Ombrasine
  – Roxana Villares Moreno
  – Pamela King
  – Wenche Steen
  – Mary Núñez
  – Evangeline Pascual
  – Maria Helene Pereira Martins
  – Milagros García
  – June Gouthier
  – Debra Josephine de Souza
  – Shelley Latham
  – Mariona Russell
  – Shiranthi Wickremesinghe
  – Mercy Nilsson
  – Magda Lepori
  – Pornpit Sakornvijit
  – Beyhan Kiral
  – Veronica Ann Cross
  – Marjorie Wallace 
  – Edicta de los Ángeles García Oporto
  – Atina Golubova

Notes

Returns

Last competed in 1968:
 
Last competed in 1970:
 
 
Last competed in 1971:
 
 
 
  (as )

Other notes

 Marjorie Wallace became the first Miss United States to be crowned Miss World. The United States' representative had previously finished as first runner-up on five occasions, in 1954, 1955, 1956, 1965, and 1969. Wallace would also become the first winner not to complete her reign when she was fired in March 1974, because she had "failed to fulfill the basic requirements of the job". The title was never offered to any of the runner-ups. Instead the remaining scheduled duties were handled by third placed Miss Jamaica. Marjorie was never officially replaced by any of the runners up.

References

Further reading

External links
 Pageantopolis – Miss World 1973

Miss World
1973 in London
1973 beauty pageants
Beauty pageants in the United Kingdom
Events at the Royal Albert Hall
November 1973 events in the United Kingdom